Collingwood was a parliamentary electorate in the Tasman region of New Zealand from 1861 to 1881.

Location

The electorate was centred on the towns of Collingwood and Tākaka in the South Island.

History

Arthur Shuckburgh Collins won the 18 March 1868 by-election, was confirmed at the 1871 general election, and resigned on 8 October 1873.

Members
The electorate was represented by three Members of Parliament:

Key

Election Results

1868 by-election

References

Historical electorates of New Zealand
Politics of the Tasman District
1860 establishments in New Zealand
1881 disestablishments in New Zealand